Highway (also known or stylized as 'हायवे एक Selfie आरपार.....!') is a 2015 Indian Marathi language road drama film produced by Vinay Vaman Ganu under Kharpoos Films banner and distributed by Arbhaat Films. Directed by Umesh Vinayak Kulkarni. The film marks Marathi debut of Bollywood actress Huma Qureshi and Tisca Chopra and newcomers Vrushali Kulkarni and Sameer Bhate. The film also debut of Bollywood music composer Amit Trivedi and singer Benny Dayal. The film has ensemble cast of Girish Kulkarni, Huma Qureshi, Renuka Shahane, Tisca Chopra, Mukta Barve, Sunil Barve, Nagraj Manjule, Shrikant Yadav, Kishor Kadam, Savita Prabhune, Vidhyadhar Joshi, Purva Pawar.

The story, screenplay and the dialogues were written by Girish Kulkarni. The soundtrack of the film is composed by Amit Trivedi and lyrics were penned by Vaibhav Joshi. Sudhakar Reddy is the film's cinematographer while the editing was done by Paresh Kamdar.

The film released in Maharashtra on 28 August 2015 and received highly positive reviews from critics, celebrities and public who praised the writing, direction and acting.

Cast
 Girish Kulkarni
 Huma Qureshi
 Renuka Shahane
 Tisca Chopra
 Mukta Barve
 Sunil Barve
 Nagraj Manjule
 Kishor Kadam
 Savita Prabhune
 Shrikant Yadav
 Kishore Chougule
 Vidyadhar Joshi
 Mayur Khandge
 Vrishali Kulkarni
 Purva Pawar
 Chhaya Kadam 
 Satish Alekar
 Shakuntal Nargekar
 Shashank Shende
 Nipun Dharmadhikari
 Vrushali Kulkarni
 Sameer Bhate
 Shubham

Soundtrack

The film's soundtrack was composed by composer Amit Trivedi; it was his debut Marathi soundtrack, the film also debut of Bollywood singer Benny Dayal while the background score has been composed by Mangesh Dhakde. The film's score consists of three tracks and all the lyrics are written by Vaibhav Joshi. The album rights of the film were acquired by Zee Music Company. The soundtrack was released on 7 May 2015.

Release
The film was first scheduled to be released on 24 July 2015 but due to technical issues the release was postponed. The film ended up releasing on 28 August 2015.

Marketing
The film's official first trailer was released on YouTube on 06 Aug 2015 and the second trailer followed on 10 Aug 2015.

References

External links
 

2015 films
2010s Marathi-language films